James Fussell may refer to:

 James Fussell III (died 1755), father of Fussell IV, see Mells River
 James Fussell IV (1748–1832), iron magnate